Always Strive and Prosper is the second studio album by American rapper ASAP Ferg. It was released on April 22, 2016, by A$AP Worldwide, Polo Grounds Music and RCA Records. The album was supported by two singles: "New Level" featuring Future, and "Back Hurt" featuring Migos. Other appearances include Missy Elliot, A$AP Mob, Chris Brown, Ty Dolla $ign, Rick Ross and Schoolboy Q, among others.

Singles
On December 18, 2015, ASAP Ferg released the album's first single, titled "New Level". The song features a guest appearance from Southern hip hop recording artist Future, with the production that was handled by Honorable C.N.O.T.E. On January 19, 2016, the music video was released for "New Level" featuring Future.

On June 28, 2016, the bonus track "Back Hurt" featuring Migos, was sent to urban radio as the album's second single. The following day, the music video was released.

Promotional singles
"Let It Bang" featuring Schoolboy Q, was released as the album's promotional single on March 24, 2016. The following day, the music video premiered for "Let It Bang" featuring Schoolboy Q. "World Is Mine" featuring Big Sean was released as the album's second promotional single on April 1, 2016. The official video for the song was released on June 26, 2016. The audio for "Hungry Ham" featuring Skrillex and Crystal Caines, was released as the album's third promotional single on April 7, 2016. The audio for "Strive" featuring Missy Elliott, was released as the album's fourth  promotional single on April 14, 2016.

Critical reception

Always Strive And Prosper has received generally positive reviews. At Metacritic which assigns a normalized rating out of 100 to reviews from critics, the album received a score of 74 based on 15 reviews, which indicates "generally favorable reviews".

Commercial performance
In the United States, the album debuted at number 8 on the Billboard 200, selling 35,000 units in its first week.

Track listing

Notes
 "Rebirth" and "Psycho" features background vocals from Nikki Grier.
 "Beautiful People" features background vocal from Nikki Grier and Lauren Pardini.
 "Grandma" features background vocals from Sid Sriram, Ajanee Hambrick and Malik Spence.

Charts

Weekly charts

Year-end charts

References

2016 albums
RCA Records albums
ASAP Ferg albums
Albums produced by DJ Khalil
Albums produced by DJ Mustard
Albums produced by Lex Luger
Albums produced by Honorable C.N.O.T.E.
Albums produced by Stargate
Albums produced by No I.D.
Albums produced by Cashmere Cat